Regina Barzilay (born 1970) is an Israeli-American computer scientist. She is a professor at the Massachusetts Institute of Technology and a faculty lead for artificial intelligence at the MIT Jameel Clinic. Her research interests are in natural language processing and applications of deep learning to chemistry and oncology.

Education 
Barzilay was born in Chișinău, Moldova and emigrated to Israel with her parents at the age of 20. She received bachelor and masters degrees from Ben-Gurion University of the Negev in 1993 and 1998, respectively. She obtained a PhD in computer science from Columbia University in 2003 for research supervised by Kathleen McKeown.

Career and research
After her PhD, she spent a year as a postdoctoral researcher at Cornell University. She was appointed as Delta Electronics Professor of Electrical Engineering and Computer Science at MIT in 2016. She was diagnosed with breast cancer in 2014, which prompted her to conduct research in oncology. Barzilay won the MacArthur Fellowship in 2017.

For her doctoral dissertation at Columbia University, she led the development of Newsblaster, which recognized stories from different news sources as being about the same basic subject, and then paraphrased elements from the stories to create a summary.

In computational linguistics, Barzilay created algorithms that learned annotations from common languages (i.e. English) to analyze less understood languages.

Prompted by her experience with breast cancer, Barzilay is applying machine learning to oncology. She is collaborating with physicians and students to devise deep learning models that utilize images, text, and structured data to identify trends that affect early diagnosis, treatment, and disease prevention.

MIT Jameel Clinic 
In 2018, Barzilay was appointed faculty lead for AI at the new MIT Jameel Clinic, a research center in the field of AI health sciences, including disease detection, drug discovery, and the development of medical devices. In 2020, she was part of the team—with fellow MIT Jameel Clinic faculty lead Professor James J. Collins—that announced the discovery through deep learning of halicin, the first new antibiotic compound for 30 years, which kills over 35 powerful bacteria, including antimicrobial-resistant tuberculosis, the superbug C. difficile, and two of the World Health Organization's top-three most deadly bacteria. In 2020, Collins, Barzilay and the MIT Jameel Clinic were also awarded funding through The Audacious Project to expand on the discovery of halicin in using AI to respond to the antibiotic resistance crisis through the development of new classes of antibiotics.

Awards and recognition
In 2017, Barzilay won the MacArthur Fellowship, known as the "Genius Grant", for "developing machine learning methods that enable computers to process and analyze vast amounts of human language data." She is also a recipient of various awards including the NSF Career Award, the MIT Technology Review TR-35 Award, Microsoft Faculty Fellowship and several Best Paper Awards at NAACL and ACL.  Her teaching has also been recognized by MIT as she won the Jamieson Teaching Award in 2016. She was nominated an AAAI Fellow in 2018 by the Association for the Advancement of Artificial Intelligence. In 2020, she became the first recipient of the $1 million AAAI Squirrel AI Award for Artificial Intelligence for the Benefit of Humanity.

References 

1971 births
Living people
Israeli computer scientists
American computer scientists
MIT School of Engineering faculty
American women computer scientists
Israeli women computer scientists
Fellows of the Association for the Advancement of Artificial Intelligence
Ben-Gurion University of the Negev alumni
Columbia University alumni
MacArthur Fellows
21st-century American scientists
American people of Israeli descent
Natural language processing researchers
Artificial intelligence researchers
American women academics
21st-century American women scientists